Richmond Road is an arterial road in Sydney, Australia.

Including the final section named Blacktown Road, it is 23.5 kilometres in length.

A short section of Richmond Road in  forms part of the A9.

Other Sydney streets by this name

Other streets named Richmond Road exist in the Sydney suburbs of:

 , continuing into .
 , continuing into .
 Homebush West.
 .
 .
 .

See also

References
 UBD Citylink Street Directory, 18th edition, 2006.

External links
 Roads and Traffic Authority page on upgrades to Richmond Road, containing a brief description.

Streets in Sydney